The Billboard Top Contemporary Christian Albums ranks the best-selling Christian music albums of the week in the United States.

Number ones

References

Christian Albums 1990s
United States Christian
Contemporary Christian Albums